Dionysius I Telmaharoyo (Latin: Dionysius Telmaharensis, Syriac: ܕܝܘܢܢܘܣܝܘܣ ܬܠܡܚܪܝܐ, Arabic: مار ديونيسيوس التلمحري), also known as Dionysius of Tel Mahre, was the Patriarch of Antioch, and head of the Syriac Orthodox Church from 818 until his death in 845.

Biography
Dionysius was born in Tal Mahre, near the city of Raqqa, into a wealthy family from Edessa, and became a monk at the Monastery of Qenneshre, where he studied philology, jurisprudence, philosophy, and theology. He also studied at the Monastery of Mar Jacob at Kayshum. In 818, Dionysius was elected Patriarch of Antioch unanimously by a synod of forty-eight bishops. After his consecration, he issued a proclamation and held three councils in Raqqa in the same year, at which he issued twelve canons. Dionysius restored the Monastery of Qenneshre in 822 after it was damaged by fire caused by dissenters.

In 826, Dionysius visited Egypt in the company of the Abbasid general Abdallah ibn Tahir al-Khurasani. He later held a council at the Monastery of Euspholis in 828, and returned to Egypt in 832 in the company of Caliph Al-Ma'mun. Whilst in Egypt, Dionysius met with Pope Jacob of Alexandria, head of the Coptic Orthodox Church, a fellow miaphysite church, and several Coptic Orthodox bishops outside of the city of Tannis. He held another council at the city of Tagrit in 834, and met with Al-Ma'mun in Baghdad, and also his successor, Caliph Al-Mu'tasim. A total of one hundred bishops were ordained by Dionysius during his tenure and he served as patriarch until his death on 22 August 845.

Works
At the request of John, Bishop of Dara, Dionysius composed the Annals, a two volume history of the church and secular events from the coronation of the Roman Emperor Maurice in 582 to the death of the Roman Emperor Theophilus in 843. One volume was dedicated to church history whilst the other covered secular history, and each volume was divided into eight books. The work was composed with use of citations of the works of Theophilus of Edessa, an 8th-century scholar. The Annals were cited extensively by Michael I, Syriac Orthodox Patriarch of Antioch (r. 1166–1199), and the anonymous author of the Chronicle of 1234. Dionysius' accounts were also later used in the Ecclesiastical History of Bar Hebraeus, Maphrian of the East (r. 1266–1286).

The Chronicle of Zuqnin was erroneously ascribed to Dionysius by Giuseppe Simone Assemani, but this has since been disregarded.

References

Bibliography

Syriac writers
845 deaths
9th-century Oriental Orthodox archbishops
Year of birth unknown
Syriac Patriarchs of Antioch from 512 to 1783
9th-century Syriac Orthodox Church bishops
Syrian archbishops
9th-century people from the Abbasid Caliphate
Upper Mesopotamia under the Abbasid Caliphate
9th-century historians
Christianity in the Abbasid Caliphate